Narcissi are widely celebrated in art and literature.  Commonly called daffodil or jonquil, the plant is associated with a number of themes in different cultures, ranging from death to good fortune. Its early blooms are invoked as a symbol of Spring, and associated religious festivals such as Easter, with the Lent lilies or Easter bells amongst its common names. The appearance of the wild flowers in spring is also associated with festivals in many places. While prized for its ornamental value, there is also an ancient cultural association with death, at least for pure white forms.

Historically the narcissus has appeared in written and visual arts since antiquity, being found in graves from Ancient Egypt. In classical Graeco-Roman literature the narcissus is associated with both the myth of the youth who was turned into a flower of that time, and with the Goddess Persephone, snatched into the underworld as she gathered their blooms. Narcissi were said to grow in meadows in the underworld. In these contexts they frequently appear in the poetry of the period from Stasinos to Pliny.

In western European culture narcissi and daffodils are among the most celebrated flowers in English literature, from Gower to Day-Lewis, while the best known poem is probably that of Wordsworth. The daffodil is the national flower of Wales, associated with St. David's Day. In the visual arts, narcissi are depicted in three different contexts, mythological, floral art, or landscapes, from mediaeval altar pieces to Salvador Dalí.

The narcissus also plays an important part in Eastern cultures from their association with the New year in Chinese culture to symbolising eyes in Islamic art. The word 'Daffodil' has been used widely in popular culture from Dutch cars to Swedish rock bands, while many cancer charities have used it as a fundraising symbol.

Symbols 

The daffodil is the national flower of Wales, where it is traditional to wear a daffodil or a leek on Saint David's Day (March 1). In Welsh the daffodil is known as "Peter's Leek", (cenhinen Bedr or cenin Pedr), the leek (cenhinen) being the other national symbol. The narcissus is also a national flower symbolising the new year or Newroz in the Kurdish culture.

The narcissus is perceived in the West as a symbol of vanity, in the East as a symbol of wealth and good fortune (see Eastern cultures). In classical Persian literature, the narcissus is a symbol of beautiful eyes, together with other flowers that equal a beautiful face with a spring garden, such as roses for cheeks and violets for shining dark hair.

In western countries the daffodil is associated with spring festivals such as Lent and its successor Easter. In Germany the wild narcissus, N. pseudonarcissus, is known as Osterglocke or "Easter bell." In the United Kingdom, particularly in ecclesiastical circles, the daffodil is sometimes variously referred to as the Lenten or Lent lily. Tradition has it that the daffodil opens on Ash Wednesday, the first day of Lent, and dies at Easter which marks the end of Lent.

Although prized as an ornamental flower, some people consider narcissi unlucky, because they hang their heads implying misfortune, and hence refuse to have them in the house. White narcissi are especially associated with death, especially the pure white N triandrus 'Thalia', and hence are considered grave flowers. Indeed, in Ancient Greece narcissi were planted near tombs. Robert Herrick, describes them as portents of death, an association which also appears in the myth of Persephone and the underworld (see The Arts, below).

The arts

Antiquity

Narcissi have been used decoratively for a long time, a wreath of white-flowered N. tazetta having been found in an ancient Egyptian grave, and in frescoes on the excavated walls of Pompeii. It is thought to have been mentioned in the Bible, for instance in the Book of Isaiah. The rose mentioned here being the original translation into English from the Biblical Hebrew word  chabatstsileth.  This so-called "Rose of Sharon" being actually a bulbous plant, probably N. tazetta which grows in Israel on the Plain of Sharon, where it is a protected plant. They make a frequent appearance in classical literature.

Greek culture 
The narcissus has also frequently appeared in literature and the visual arts, and forms part of two important Graeco-Roman myths, that of the youth Narcissus who was turned into the flower of that name, and of the Goddess Kore, or Persephone daughter of the goddess Demeter, snatched into the Underworld by the god Hades while picking narcissi. Hence, the narcissus is listed as having been sacred to both Hades and Persephone, and to grow along the banks of the river Styx (Στύξ) in the underworld.

The Greek poet Stasinos (flourished ca. 800 – 900 BC) mentioned them in the Cypria (Κυπρία) in which he sings of the flowers of the island of Cyprus.

The legend of Persephone comes to us primarily in the anonymous seventh century BC Homeric Hymn To Demeter (Εἲς Δημήτραν),. In the opening scene, the author describes the narcissus, and its role as a lure to trap the young Persephone.

The flower, she later recounts to her mother was the last flower she reached for; "νάρκισσόν θ᾽, ὃν ἔφυσ᾽ ὥς περ κρόκον εὐρεῖα χθών" (l. 428)
"and the narcissus which the wide earth caused to grow yellow as a crocus".

Other Greek authors making reference to the narcissus include Sophocles (c. 497 – 406 BC) and Plutarch (c. 46 AD – 120 AD). Sophocles, in his Oedipus at Colonus (Οἰδίπους ἐπὶ Κολωνῷ) utilises narcissus in a highly symbolic manner, implying fertility, and allying it with the cults of Demeter and her daughter Kore (Persephone) (μεγάλαιν θεαίν, the Great Goddesses), but by extension through the Persephone association, a symbol of death. Jebb comments here that νάρκισσος is the flower of imminent death with its fragrance being νάρκη or narcotic, emphasised by its pale white colour. Just as Persephone reaching for the flower heralded her doom, the youth Narcissus gazing at his own reflection portended his death.

Plutarch refers to this in his Symposiacs as follows, "and the daffodil, because it benumbs the nerves and causes a stupid narcotic heaviness in the limbs, and therefore Sophocles calls it the ancient garland flower of the great (that is, the earthy) gods." This reference to Sophocles' "crown of the great Goddesses", here is the source of the commonly quoted phrase in the English literature "Chaplet of the infernal Gods" incorrectly attributed to Socrates.

A passage by Moschus' (fl. 100 BC) has been incorrectly attributed to Theocritus (fl. c. 150  BC). Moschus describes fragrant narcissi (νάρκισσον ἐΰπνοον) in his Idylls (Εἰδύλλια), "Now the girls so soon as they were come to the flowering meadows took great delight in various sorts of flowers whereof one would pluck sweet breathed narcissus" (Europa and the Bull),
 and narcissi were said to have been part of Europa's floral headdress.

Another Greek writer, Homer (ca. 7th century BC), in his Odyssey (Ὀδύσσεια), in several places (e.g. Od. 11:539; 24.14) described the underworld as having Elysian meadows (Ἠλύσιον πεδίον) carpeted with flowers, though using the term asphodel (ἀσφοδελὸν), hence Asphodel Meadows. This may have actually been narcissus, with its associations with the underworld, as described by Theophrastus, and frequently used in later literature to refer to daffodils. A similar account is provided by Lucian (c. 125 – 180 AD) in his Necyomantia or Menippus (Μένιππος ἢ Νεκυομαντεία), describing asphodel in the underworld (Nec. 11:2; 21:10).

The myth of the youth Narcissus is also taken up by Pausanias (c. 110 – 180AD) in his Description of Greece (Ἑλλάδος περιήγησις). Pausanias, deferring to Pamphos, believed that the myth of Persephone long antedated that of Narcissus, and hence discounts the idea the flower was named after the youth.

Roman culture 
Virgil (Publius Vergilius Maro, 70 BC – 19 AD), the first known Roman writer to refer to the narcissus, does so in several places, for instance twice in the Georgics, Book four, l. 122 "nec sera comantem Narcissum" (nor had I passed in silence the late-flowering narcissus) and l. 159 "pars intra septa domorum, Narcissi lacrymam" (some within the enclosure of their Hives, lay Narcissus' tears). Virgil refers to the cup shaped corona of the narcissus flower, allegedly containing the tears of the youth Narcissus. Milton makes a similar analogy in his Lycidas "And Daffodillies fill their Cups with Tears". Virgil also mentions narcissi three times in the Eclogues. In the second book l. 48 "Narcissum et florem jungit bene olentis anenthi" (joins the narcissus and flower of sweet-smelling anise), also the fifth book, l. 38 "pro purpureo narcisso" (in lieu of the empurpled narcissus). For the idea that narcissus could be purple, see also Dioscorides (επ ενίων δε πορφυροειδές) and Pliny (sunt et purpurea lilia). This was thought to be an allusion to the purple-rimmed corona of N. poeticus. Finally, in the eighth book of the Eclogues, Virgil writes, l. 53 "narcisso floreat alnus" (the alder with narcissus bloom).

Ovid (Publius Ovidius Naso, 43 BC – 17 AD) was also familiar with narcissi, in his recounting of the self-loving youth who is turned into the flower, in the third book of his Metamorphoses l. 509 "croceum pro corpore florem inveniunt, foliis medium cingemtibus albis" (They came upon a flower, instead of his body, with white petals surrounding a yellow heart) and also the fifth book of his Fasti l. 201 "Tu quoque nomen habes cultos, Narcisse, per hortos" (You too, Narcissus, were known among the gardens).
This theme of metamorphosis was broader than just Narcissus, for instance see crocus (Krokus), laurel (Daphne) and hyacinth (Hyacinthus). He also advocated the use of the bulb of the narcissus as a cosmetic, in his Medicamina Faciei Femineae (Cosmetics for the Female Face), ll. 63–64 "adice narcissi bis sex sine cortice bulbos, strenua quos puro marmore dextra terat" (add twelve narcissus bulbs after removing their skin, and pound them vigorously on a pure marble mortar).

Western culture 

Although there is no clear evidence that the flower's name derives directly from the Greek myth, this link between the flower and the myth became firmly part of western culture.

The narcissus or daffodil is the most loved of all English plants, and appears frequently in English literature. Many English writers have referred to the cultural and symbolic importance of Narcissus, for instance Elizabeth Kent (Flora Domestica, 1823), FW Burbidge (The Narcissus, 1875), Peter Barr (Ye Narcissus Or Daffodyl Flowere, 1884), and Henry Nicholson Ellacombe (The Plant-lore & Garden-craft of Shakespeare, 1884). No flower has received more poetic description except the rose and the lily, with poems by authors including John Gower, Spenser, Constable, Shakespeare, Addison and Thomson, together with Milton (see Roman culture, above), Wordsworth, Shelley and Keats. Frequently the poems deal with self-love derived from Ovid's account. An example of this is Gower's retelling of Ovid's Metamorphoses :

Gower's reference to the yellow flower of the legend has been assumed to be the daffodil or Narcissus, though as with all references in the older literature to the flower that sprang from the youth's death, there is room for some debate as to the exact species of flower indicated, some preferring Crocus.

Spenser announces the coming of the Daffodil in Aprill of his Shepheardes Calender (1579), "Strowe me the ground with Daffadowndillies".
Constable compares the object of affection to the daffodil,

Shakespeare, who frequently uses flower imagery, refers to daffodils twice in The Winter's Tale (Autolycus act iv, sc. 3(1) "When Daffodils begin to peer" and Perdita act iv, sc. 4(118) "Daffodils, That come before the swallow dares, and take The winds of March with beauty" 1623)., and also in The Two Noble Kinsmen  (act iv, sc. 1(94) "chaplets on their heads of Daffodillies" 1634). However Shakespeare also uses the term 'Narcissus' in the latter (act ii, sc. 2(130) "What flowre is this? Tis called Narcissus, madam").

Robert Herrick, in Hesperides (1648) alludes to their association with death in a number of poems such as To Daffadills ("Faire Daffadills we weep to see, You haste away so soone") and Divination by a Daffadill;

Among the English romantic movement writers none is better known than William Wordsworth's short 1804 poem I Wandered Lonely as a Cloud (The Daffodils) which has become linked in the popular mind with the daffodils that form its main image, here associated with vitality and pleasure. Wordsworth also included the daffodil in other poems, such as Foresight. Yet the description given of daffodils by his sister, Dorothy is just as poetic, if not more so, just that her poetry was prose and appears almost an unconscious imitation of first section of the Homeric Hymn to Demeter (see Greek culture, above);

Among their contemporaries, Keats refers to daffodils among those things capable of bringing 'joy for ever';

while Shelley looks back to the legend in his description of the flower;

A. E. Housman, using one of the daffodil's more symbolic names (see Symbols), wrote the Spring poem The Lent Lily in his collection A Shropshire Lad, describing the traditional Easter death of the daffodil:

Later Cecil Day-Lewis wrote:

In  Black Narcissus (1939) Rumer Godden describes the disorientation of English nuns in the Indian Himalayas, and gives the plant name an unexpected twist, alluding both to narcissism and the effect of the perfume Narcisse Noir (Caron) on others. The novel was later adapted into the  1947 British film of the same name.

The narcissus also appears in German literature. Paul Gerhardt, a pastor and hymn writer wrote:

In the visual arts, narcissi are depicted in three different contexts, mythological (Narcissus, Persephone), floral art, or landscapes. The Narcissus story has been popular with painters and the youth is frequently depicted with flowers to indicate this association, for instance those of François Lemoyne, John William Waterhouse, and that of Poussin depicting flowers sprouting around the dying Narcissus, or Salvador Dalí's Metamorphosis of Narcissus. The Persephone theme is also typified by Waterhouse in his Narcissus, the floral motif by van Scorel and the landscape by Van Gogh's Undergrowth.

Narcissi first started to appear in western art in the late middle ages, in panel paintings, particularly those depicting crucifixion. For instance there is a crucifixion scene by the Westfälischer Meister in Köln (c. 1415 – 1435) in the Wallraf-Richartz-Museum, Cologne, where daffodils symbolise not only death but also hope in the resurrection, because they are perennial and bloom at Easter. Another example from this period is the altarpiece panel Noli me tangere from the Magdalenenkirche, Hildesheim Germany, by the Meister des Göttinger Barfüßeraltars (c. 1410). In the centre of the panel, between the hand of Jesus and Mary Magdalene, daffodils can be seen growing.

Eastern cultures 

In Chinese culture interest in narcissi centres on Narcissus tazetta, which can be grown indoors. Narcissus tazetta subsp. chinensis is widely grown in China as an ornamental plant and often known outside China as Chinese sacred lilies (N. tazetta 'Chinese Sacred Lily', 水仙花) or joss flowers. Tazetta daffodils were probably introduced to China, where they became naturalised, by Arab traders travelling the Silk Road at some time prior to the beginning of the Song Dynasty (i.e. before 960), presumably for their claimed medicinal properties. Flowering in spring, they became associated with Chinese New Year, signifying good fortune, prosperity and good luck. If the narcissus blooms on Chinese New Year, it is said to bring extra wealth and good fortune throughout the year. Its sweet fragrance is also highly revered in Chinese culture. The flower has many names in Chinese culture, including water narcissus (since they can be grown in water) and seui sin faa (water immortal flowers). In ancient Chinese culture the narcissus is referred to as water goddess of the Xiang River, or the "goddess standing above the waves" (lingbo xianzi), also translated as "fairy over rippling waters". There are many legends in Chinese culture associated with Narcissus, including one of a poor but good man who was brought great wealth by this flower.

As Chinese Garden Art expert Marianne Beuchert writes, in contrast to the West, narcissi have not played a significant part in Chinese Garden art, but have become a symbol of good luck, in which the multi-headed inflorescence of N. tazetta symbolised a hundred headed water spirit. However, Zhao Mengjian (趙孟堅, c. 1199 – 1267), in the Southern Song Dynasty was noted for his portrayal of narcissi, and Zhao's love of the flower is celebrated by the loyalist Song poet Qiu Yuan (c. 1247 – 1327).

Narcissus bulb carving and cultivation has become an art akin to Japanese bonsai. The bulbs may be carved to create curling leaves (crab claw culture). The bulbs can produce six to eleven flower stems from a single bulb, each with an average of eight fragrant blooms. With the additional use of props such as ribbons, artificial eyes, bindings and florists' wire, even more elaborate scenarios can be created, representing traditional subjects such as roosters, cranes, flower baskets and even teapots.

The Japanese visual novel Narcissu contains many references to the narcissus, the main characters setting out for the famed narcissus fields on Awaji Island, N. tazetta having also naturalised there.

Islamic culture 

Islamic scholar Annemarie Schimmel states that the narcissi (called   in Persian, whence the Arabic, Turkic and Urdu common names) are one of the most popular garden plants in Islamic culture. The Persian ruler Khosrau I is said to have not been able to tolerate them at feasts because they reminded him of eyes, an association that persists to this day. The Persian phrase  (literally "a reddish-blue narcissus") is a well-known metonymy for the "eye(s) of a mistress" in the classical poetries of the Persian, Turkic, and Urdu languages; to this day also the vernacular names of some narcissus cultivars (for example, Shahla-ye Shiraz and Shahla-ye Kazerun). As described by the poet Ghalib (1797–1869), "God has given the eye of the narcissus the power of seeing". The imagery could also be negative, such as blindness (white eye), sleepless or longing for love. The eye imagery is also found in a number of poems by Abu Nuwas (756–814). In one of his most famous poems about narcissi he writes "eyes of silver with pupils of molten gold united with an emerald stalk". Schimmel describes an Arab legend that despite the apparent sinfulness of much of his poetry, his narcissus poems alone would earn him a place in Paradise. Another poet who refers to narcissi, is Rumi (1207–1273). Even the prophet Mohammed is said to have praised the narcissus, "Whoever has two loaves of bread, sell one and buy narcissi, for while bread nourishes the body, the narcissus feeds the soul".

Popular culture 
The word 'Daffodil' has been used widely in popular culture from Dutch cars to Swedish rock bands.

Festivals 
In some areas where wild narcissi are particularly prevalent, their blooming in spring is celebrated in festivals. The slopes around Montreux, Switzerland and its associated riviera come alive with blooms each May (May Snow), and are associated with the Narcissi Festival. However, the narcissi are now considered threatened. Festivals are held in many other countries and regions including Fribourg (Switzerland), Austria and in the United States, including Hawaii (Chinese New Year) and Washington state's Daffodil Festival.

Cancer 
Various cancer charities around the world, including  the American Cancer Society, New Zealand Cancer Society, Cancer Council Australia, the Irish Cancer Society, and Marie Curie (UK)'s Great Daffodil Appeal use the daffodil emblem as a fundraising symbol. "Daffodil Days", first instituted in Toronto in 1957 by the Canadian Cancer Society, are organized to raise funds by offering the flowers in return for a donation.

Notes

References

Bibliography

Antiquity

Mediaeval and Early Modern 
  (see also Facsimile of original edition)

Nineteenth century 
  Later attributed to Elizabeth Kent and Leigh Hunt.
 
 
  (also available as pdf)

Contemporary

Islamic and Eastern

Biogeography

Botanical works

Historical and literary criticism

Reference material 
 
 

 

Narcissus (plant)
National symbols of Wales
Symbols of Hades
Plants in culture